The tenth season of South Park, an American animated television series created by Trey Parker and Matt Stone, began airing on March 22, 2006. The tenth season concluded after 14 episodes on November 15, 2006. This is the last season featuring Isaac Hayes (the voice of Chef) as Hayes quit the show following the backlash behind season nine's "Trapped in the Closet" episode. This season also had a minor controversy when the Halloween episode "Hell on Earth 2006" depicted The Crocodile Hunter's Steve Irwin with a stingray lodged in his chest getting thrown out of Satan's Halloween party for not being in costume. All the episodes in this season were written and directed by Trey Parker.

This season is also home to the episode, "Make Love, Not Warcraft", which won the Primetime Emmy Award for Outstanding Animated Program (for Programming Less Than One Hour) in 2007. The season also features the two-part episodes "Cartoon Wars Part I" & II, which involved Family Guy trying to air an image of the Islamic prophet Muhammad, and "Go God Go" which involved a future world where there was no religion. The season was listed as one of the 20 Best Seasons of the Last 20 Years by Pajiba.

The events of season 10 were featured in the mobile game South Park 10: The Game, released March 28, 2007.

Episodes

References

External links

 South Park Studios – official website with streaming video of full episodes.
 The Comedy Network – full episodes for Canada

 
2006 American television seasons